Lars Huijer (born September 22, 1993) is a Dutch professional baseball pitcher for the Hoofddorp Pioners of the Dutch Major Leagues.

Huijer signed with the Seattle Mariners, and was traded to the Chicago Cubs for Mike Kickham. Huijer was named to the Netherlands national baseball team roster for the 2017 World Baseball Classic. He played for Team Netherlands in the 2019 European Baseball Championship, at the Africa/Europe 2020 Olympic Qualification tournament, and at the 2023 World Baseball Classic.

References

External links

1993 births
2016 European Baseball Championship players
2017 World Baseball Classic players
2019 European Baseball Championship players
Arizona League Mariners players
Baseball pitchers
Clinton LumberKings players
Dutch expatriate baseball players in the United States
Everett AquaSox players
High Desert Mavericks players
Konica Minolta Pioniers players
Living people
Pulaski Mariners players
Sportspeople from Haarlem
Vaessen Pioniers players
2023 World Baseball Classic players